Sir Clement Throckmorton  was an English politician who sat in the House of Commons between 1624 and 1626.

Throckmorton was the son of Job Throckmorton of Haseley Warwickshire and his wife Dorothy Vernon, daughter of Thomas Vernon of Howell, Staffordshire. He was awarded BA from Queen's College, Oxford having been allowed to count 8 terms at Cambridge University. He was a student of Inner Temple in 1600. In 1624, Throckmorton was elected Member of Parliament for Warwickshire. He was re-elected MP for Warwickshire in 1625 and 1626. He was, according to Dugdale, "not a little eminent for his learning and eloquence".

Throckmorton married Lettice Fisher, daughter of Sir Clement Fisher of Packington, Warwickshire and was the father of Job and Clement.

References

Year of birth missing
Year of death missing
English MPs 1624–1625
English MPs 1625
English MPs 1626
Alumni of The Queen's College, Oxford
Clement